Karam Shyam is an Indian politician and member of the Bharatiya Janata Party. He is a member of the Manipur Legislative Assembly from the Langthabal constituency in Imphal West district. He was a cabinet ninister in N. Biren Singh's government. He was mMinister of PDS and consumer affairs, weights and measures, revenue, relief and rehabilitation.

Before the 2022 Manipur Legislative Assembly Election, he joined BJP in 2021. Until 2021 he was member of LJP.

Shyam is also a sports enthusiast.

References 

People from Imphal West district
Lok Janshakti Party politicians
Manipur MLAs 2017–2022
Living people
Bharatiya Janata Party politicians from Manipur
Manipur MLAs 2022–2027
1962 births